Jonage is a commune in the Metropolis of Lyon in Auvergne-Rhône-Alpes region in eastern France.

Population

See also
Communes of the Metropolis of Lyon

References

Communes of Lyon Metropolis
Dauphiné